Spacedust & Ocean Views is an album by Anders Osborne released in 2016 by Back on Dumaine Records. It was the first of two albums released by Osborne in 2016, the second album being Flower Box. The first single off the album "Lafayette" was released on January 15, 2016 via American Songwriter.

Track listing 
All songs were written by Anders Osborne with the exception of "Tchoupitoulas Street Parade" written by Anders Osborne & John Michael Rouchell and "From Space" written by Anders Osborne, Johnny Vidacovich, & Debra Vidacovich.

Personnel 
Mark Howard & Anders Osborne - Producing
Mark Howard - Mixing & Engineering
Lurssen Mastering - Mastering
Eric Heigle - Assistant Engineer
Justin Tocket - Assistant Engineer
Phil Frank - Guitar Tech

References

2016 albums
Anders Osborne albums